Rent a Friend (2000) is a romantic comedy film directed by Eddy Terstall. The film was produced by Jordaan Film and BNN TV.

Plot 
Alfred is a talented artist. He does not care to be rich or famous and gives full attention to his artworks and creation. His girlfriend Moniek is a successful writer for a popular soap opera. Alfred's lack of ambition and negligence towards money and material life irritates Moniek, who bases the plot for each soap opera episode on her own life. Alfred discovers Moniek has been conducting an affair with her boss after watching the soap opera, and moves in with his sister after the couple splits. To support himself, he begins offering his services as a friend to strangers at 50 guilders per hour.

Cast 
 Marc Van Uchelen as Arthur 
 Rifka Lodeizen as Moniek 
 Nadja Hupscher as Françoise 
 Huub Stapel as Mr. Bloedworst 
 Victor Löw as Mr. Duitschenbloed 
 Peer Mascini as Smulders

Reception
Writing for Variety, David Rooney said the film "feels less spontaneous and fresh than Terstall's prior film Based on the Novel and called it a "slickly produced comedy [that] looks mainly TV-bound [outside its home market]." In a capsule review for Chicago Reader, Ted Shen noted an influence from Woody Allen but called the film "paper-thin" and "sometimes too cute to be effective". Conversely Rotten Tomatoes users stated that 80% of them liked the film with an average score of 3.9 out of 5.

References

External links 
 

Dutch romantic comedy films
2000s Dutch-language films